Simon Ryfors (born August 16, 1997) is a Swedish professional ice hockey forward who is currently playing for the Syracuse Crunch of the American Hockey League (AHL) while under contract to the Tampa Bay Lightning of the National Hockey League (NHL).

Playing career
Undrafted, Ryfors played in his native Sweden, within the youth program of Rögle BK. He made his professional debut with Rögle BK in Swedish Hockey League (SHL) during the 2015–16 season. 

In his sixth season with the club in 2020–21, Ryfors appeared in 51 games posting 25 goals and 45 points. He led Rögle BK in goals and ranked second for points. Helping the club in the post-season reach the Championship finals, he contributed with a goal and 10 points through 14 playoff games.

On 12 May 2021, Ryfors agreed to sign a one year, two-way contract with the Tampa Bay Lightning of the NHL.

Career statistics

References

External links
 

1997 births
Living people
IK Oskarshamn players
Rögle BK players
Ice hockey people from Stockholm
Swedish ice hockey forwards
Syracuse Crunch players